Joe Cooper may refer to:
Joe Cooper (basketball) (born 1957), American basketball player
Joe Cooper (footballer, born 1865) (1865–?), English footballer for Wolverhampton Wanderers and Woolwich Arsenal
Joe Cooper (footballer, born 1899) (1899–1959), English footballer for Grimsby Town and several other clubs
Joe Cooper (footballer, born 1918) (1918–1992), English footballer
Joe Cooper (footballer, born 1994), English football defender
Joe Cooper (ice hockey) (1914–1979), Canadian ice hockey player
Joe Cooper (kicker) (born 1960), American football player
Joe Cooper (linebacker) (born 1979), American football player
Joe Cooper (racing driver) (1888–1915), American racing driver
Joe Henry Cooper (1918–1980), American businessman and Louisiana politician
Joe Cooper (presenter), British broadcaster & radio presenter

See also
Joseph Cooper (disambiguation)